Mirela Țugurlan (born September 4, 1980 in Focșani, Romania) is a Romanian artistic gymnast. She is a 1996 Olympic bronze medalist and a 1997 world gold medalist with the team. She was not originally expected to be a member of the Romanian Olympic team in Atlanta, but was added to the roster after Ana Maria Bican sustained a serious knee injury in training after having arrived in Atlanta. Despite her relative lack of experience competing at the international senior level, Țugurlan performed solidly on the Olympic stage and contributed to Romania's bronze medal finish. A year later at the world championships in Lausanne, Switzerland, Țugurlan helped the Romanian women win their third consecutive world team title.

References

External links
 
 
 

1980 births
Living people
Sportspeople from Focșani
Romanian female artistic gymnasts
Olympic gymnasts of Romania
Olympic bronze medalists for Romania
Olympic medalists in gymnastics
Gymnasts at the 1996 Summer Olympics
Medalists at the 1996 Summer Olympics
Medalists at the World Artistic Gymnastics Championships
20th-century Romanian women